Cassina may refer to:

Places in Italy
Cassina de' Pecchi, in the province of Milan
Cassina Rizzardi, in the province of Como
Cassina Valsassina, in the province of Lecco
Cassina Amata, in the province of Milan
Cassina Nuova, in the province of Milan
Cassina, ancient name of Cascina, in the province of Pisa

People with the surname
Igor Cassina, Italian gymnast

Other uses
Ilex cassine (Dahoon Holly)
Ilex vomitoria (Yaupon Holly)
The black drink brewed by Native Americans of the Southeastern United States from the leaves of the Yaupon Holly
Cassina S.p.A., manufacturer of design furniture in Milan

See also 
 Cassini (disambiguation)